Edward Preble Little (November 7, 1791 – February 6, 1875) was a member of the United States House of Representatives from Massachusetts.  He was born in Marshfield in 1791.  He attended public schools. At the age of nine (in 1800) he was on the U.S. frigate Boston with his father, Capt. George Little, at the suggestion of President John Adams, who gave him a commission as midshipman.  He engaged in agricultural pursuits.

Career
Little served as a member of the Massachusetts House of Representatives and was elected as a Democrat to the Thirty-second Congress to fill the vacancy caused by the death of Orin Fowler. He served from December 13, 1852, to March 3, 1853.  He was not a candidate for renomination to the Thirty-third Congress, but served as collector of customs at the port of Plymouth.  
Edward Preble Little was named after Commodore Edward Preble.  His parents were Capt. George Little (1754-1809) and Rachel (Rogers) Little (1758-1838).  Edward Preble Little married Edy Rogers (1789-1852) March 13, 1811 in Marshfield, Massachusetts.
Source: "John Rogers of Marshfield" 1898 by Josiah H. Drummond, pages 69 and 87.

Agriculture
Little resumed agricultural pursuits, and died in Lynn, Massachusetts on February 6, 1875.  His interment was in the Congregational Church Cemetery in Marshfield Hills.

References

Democratic Party members of the Massachusetts House of Representatives
1875 deaths
1791 births
Democratic Party members of the United States House of Representatives from Massachusetts
19th-century American politicians